James Ilgenfritz (born 1978) is an American composer, bassist, and multi-instrumentalist. He is also a jazz sideman.

As a composer, he is known for his surreal experimental multimedia chamber operas, including The Ticket That Exploded (2011, in residency at ISSUE Project Room), and I Looked At The Eclipse (2019, in residency at Roulette Intermedium), and frenetic chamber works including In The Summer Every Truth Is Like A Saturday (2019).

As a jazz and experimental music sideman, he has collaborated with Lukas Ligeti and Eyal Maoz (in the trio Hypercolor), Elliott Sharp, Pauline Oliveros, Roscoe Mitchell, Anthony Braxton, John Zorn, Miya Masaoka, JG Thirlwell, Annie Gosfield, SEM Ensemble, Liturgy, and Ghost Ensemble.

Ilgenfritz studied at UCSD with Mark Dresser, Charles Curtis, and Miller Puckette.

He also runs the label Infrequent Seams, which has released music by Ilgenfritz, Elliott Sharp, Steve Buscemi, Miya Masaoka, Zeena Parkins, Myra Melford, Ben Richter, Object Collection, and others.

Discography

You Scream A Rapid Language - CD (Infrequent Seams, December 2019)
Opalescence - CD (Telegraph Harp, July 2018)
Origami Cosmos - CD (Infrequent Seams, March 2017)
The Ticket That Exploded (An Opera) - CD (Con D'Or, 2015)
Compositions (Braxton) - CD (Infrequent Seams, 2012)

References

External links 
 Official web site

Living people
1978 births
Experimental composers
American double-bassists
American experimental musicians
21st-century American composers
21st-century classical composers
American classical composers
American classical musicians
American male classical composers
21st-century American male musicians
20th-century American male musicians